Novosilski Bay is a bay 2 miles (3.2 km) wide, indenting the south coast of South Georgia immediately south of Mount Fraser. Discovered by a Russian expedition under Bellingshausen in 1819 and named for Lieutenant Pavel M. Novosilskiy of the Mirny, which accompanied Bellingshausen's flagship the Vostok during the First Russian Antarctic Expedition of 1819–21. The spelling Novosilski has become established for the feature through long usage.

See also
Nilsen Island

Bays of South Georgia